This is a list of countries based on the official development assistance (ODA) they have received for the given year.

More comprehensive and current lists are available from the OECD (Table DAC2a) and the World Bank (Net official development assistance and official aid received (current US$)).

Methodology 
The figures shown are based on OECD measures and definitions of international aid. Amounts are in "current U.S. dollars", i.e. amounts paid at the time, not adjusted for later or earlier inflation or currency movements.

List

See also 
 List of governments by development aid
 United States foreign aid

References

 
International economics lists
International rankings
Lists of countries by economic indicator
Lists of countries by population-related issue
OECD